Kaala or Mount Kaala (pronounced  in Hawaiian) is the highest mountain on the island of Oahu, at . It is a part of the Waianae Range, an eroded shield volcano on the west side of the island. The FAA maintains an active tracking station at the summit, which is closed to the general public and secured by the US Army which is stationed at the base of the mountain, at Schofield Barracks. The tracking station can be clearly seen from afar as a white domed shaped structure.


See also

List of mountain peaks of the United States
List of volcanoes of the United States
List of mountain peaks of Hawaii
Evolution of Hawaiian volcanoes
Hawaii hotspot
Hawaiian–Emperor seamount chain

References

Volcanoes of Oahu
Mountains of Hawaii
Landforms of Oahu